A jester, court jester, fool or joker was a member of the household of a nobleman or a monarch employed to entertain guests during the medieval and Renaissance eras. Jesters were also itinerant performers who entertained common folk at fairs and town markets, and the discipline continues into the modern day, where jesters perform at historical-themed events.

During the Middle Ages, jesters are often thought to have worn brightly colored clothes and eccentric hats in a motley pattern. Their modern counterparts usually mimic this costume. Jesters entertained with a wide variety of skills: principal among them were song, music, and storytelling, but many also employed acrobatics, juggling, telling jokes (such as puns, stereotypes, and imitation), and performing magic tricks. Much of the entertainment was performed in a comic style. Many jesters made contemporary jokes in word or song about people or events well known to their audiences.

Etymology
The modern use of the English word jester did not come into use until the mid-16th century, during Tudor times. This modern term derives from the older form gestour, or jestour, originally from Anglo-Norman (French) meaning 'storyteller' or 'minstrel'. Other earlier terms included fol, disour, buffoon, and bourder. These terms described entertainers who differed in their skills and performances but who all shared many similarities in their role as comedic performers for their audiences.

History
In ancient Rome, a similar tradition of professional jesters were called . Balatrones were paid for their jests, and the tables of the wealthy were generally open to them for the sake of the amusement they afforded.

Other cultures such as the Aztecs and the Chinese employed cultural equivalents to the jester.

English royal court jesters
Many royal courts throughout English royal history employed entertainers and most had professional fools, sometimes called "licensed fools". Entertainment included music, storytelling, and physical comedy. Fool Societies, or groups of nomadic entertainers, were often hired to perform acrobatics and juggling.

Jesters were also occasionally used as psychological warfare. Jesters would ride in front of their troops, provoke or mock the enemy, and even serve as messengers. They played an important part in raising their own army's spirits by singing songs and reciting stories.

Henry VIII of England employed a jester named Will Sommers. His daughter Mary was entertained by Jane Foole.

During the reigns of Elizabeth I and James I of England, William Shakespeare wrote his plays and performed with his theatre company the Lord Chamberlain's Men (later called the King's Men). Clowns and jesters were featured in Shakespeare's plays, and the company's expert on jesting was Robert Armin, author of the book Fooled upon Foole. In Shakespeare's Twelfth Night, Feste the jester is described as "wise enough to play the fool".

In Scotland, Mary, Queen of Scots, had a jester called Nichola. Her son, King James VI of Scotland, employed a jester called Archibald Armstrong. During his lifetime Armstrong was given great honors at court. He was eventually thrown out of the King's employment when he over-reached and insulted too many influential people. Even after his disgrace, books telling of his jests were sold in London streets. He held some influence at court still in the reign of Charles I and estates of land in Ireland. Anne of Denmark had a Scottish jester called Tom Durie. Charles I later employed a jester called Jeffrey Hudson who was very popular and loyal. Jeffrey Hudson had the title of "Royal Dwarf" because he was short of stature. One of his jests was to be presented hidden in a giant pie from which he would leap out. Hudson fought on the Royalist side in the English Civil War. A third jester associated with Charles I was called Muckle John.

Jester's privilege
Jester's privilege is the ability and right of a jester to talk and mock freely without being punished. As an acknowledgement of this right, the court jester had symbols denoting their status and protection under the law: the crown (cap and bells) and scepter (marotte), mirroring the royal crown and scepter wielded by a monarch.

Martin Luther used jest in many of his criticisms against the Catholic Church. In the introduction to his To the Christian Nobility of the German Nation, he calls himself a court jester, and, later in the text, he explicitly invokes the jester's privilege when saying that monks should break their chastity vows.

Natural vs artificial fools

There are two major groups when it comes to defining fools: artificial fools and natural fools. Natural fools consisted of people who were deemed "mentally defective," or as having a "deficiency in their education, experience or innate capacity for understanding," and stood as someone for the rest of society to laugh at. This policy was not generally criticized during its time. Groups of people even saw this act as a positive one, as these "natural" comedians were not typically able to have a job or earn any sort of living on their own. The second group, artificial fools, is what most people in modern times imagine when they hear the word "jester": someone who comes up with witty and original jokes in order to entertain a royal court. The main difference between the two groups is that a natural fool's comedy is not done intentionally while an artificial fool's is.

Political significance
Scholar David Carlyon has cast doubt on the "daring political jester", calling historical tales "apocryphal", and concluding that "popular culture embraces a sentimental image of the clown; writers reproduce that sentimentality in the jester, and academics in the Trickster", but it "falters as analysis".

Jesters could also give bad news to the King that no one else would dare deliver. In 1340, when the French fleet was destroyed at the Battle of Sluys by the English, Phillippe VI's jester told him the English sailors "don't even have the guts to jump into the water like our brave French".

End of tradition
After the Restoration, Charles II did not reinstate the tradition of the court jester, but he did greatly patronize the theatre and proto-music hall entertainments, especially favouring the work of Thomas Killigrew. Though Killigrew was not officially a jester, Samuel Pepys in his famous diary does call Killigrew "The King's fool and jester, with the power to mock and revile even the most prominent without penalty" (12 February 1668). The last British nobles to keep jesters were the Queen Mother's family, the Bowes-Lyons.

In the 18th century, jesters had died out except in Russia, Spain, and Germany. In France and Italy, travelling groups of jesters performed plays featuring stylized characters in a form of theatre called the commedia dell'arte. A version of this passed into British folk tradition in the form of a puppet show, Punch and Judy. In France the tradition of the court jester ended with the French Revolution.

In the 21st century, the jester has been revived and can still be seen at medieval-style fairs and pageants.

In 2015, the town of Conwy in North Wales appointed Russel Erwood (aka Erwyd le Fol) as the official resident jester of the town and its people, a post that had been vacant since 1295.

Other countries

Poland's most famous court jester was Stańczyk, whose jokes were usually related to political matters, and who later became a historical symbol for Poles.

In 2004 English Heritage appointed Nigel Roder ("Kester the Jester") as the State Jester for England, the first since Muckle John 355 years previously. However, following an objection by the National Guild of Jesters, English Heritage accepted they were not authorised to grant such a title. Roder was succeeded as "Heritage Jester" by Pete Cooper ("Peterkin the Fool").

In Germany, Till Eulenspiegel is a folkloric hero dating back to medieval times and ruling each year over Fasching or Carnival time, mocking politicians and public figures of power and authority with political satire like a modern-day court jester. He holds a mirror to make us aware of our times (Zeitgeist), and his sceptre, his "bauble," or marotte, is the symbol of his power.

In 17th century Spain, little people, often with deformities, were employed as buffoons to entertain the king and his family, especially the children. In Velázquez's painting Las Meninas two dwarfs are included: Maria Bárbola, a female dwarf from Germany with hydrocephalus, and Nicolasito Portusato from Italy. Mari Bárbola can also be seen in a later portrait of princess Margarita Teresa in mourning by Juan Bautista Martinez del Mazo. There are other paintings by Velázquez that include court dwarves such as Prince Balthasar Charles With a Dwarf.

During the Renaissance Papacy, the Papal court in Rome had a court jester, similar to the secular courts of the time. Pope Pius V dismissed the court Jester, and no later Pope employed one.

In Japan from the 13th to 18th centuries, the taikomochi, a kind of male geisha, attended the feudal lords (daimyōs). They entertained mostly through dancing and storytelling, and were at times counted on for strategic advice. By the 16th century they fought alongside their lord in battle in addition to their other duties.

Tonga was the first royal court to appoint a court jester in the 20th century; Taufa'ahau Tupou IV, the King of Tonga, appointed JD Bogdanoff to that role in 1999. Bogdanoff was later embroiled in a financial scandal.

As a symbol
The root of the word "fool" is from the Latin follis, which means "bag of wind" or bellows or that which contains air or breath.

In Tarot
In Tarot, "The Fool" is a card of the Major Arcana. The tarot depiction of the Fool includes a man (or less often, a woman) holding a white rose in one hand and a small bundle of possessions in the other with a dog or cat at his heels. The fool is in the act of unknowingly walking off the edge of a cliff, precipice, or other high place. (Compare: Joker (playing card)).

In literature
In literature, the jester is symbolic of common sense and of honesty, notably in King Lear, where the court jester is a character used for insight and advice on the part of the monarch, taking advantage of his license to mock and speak freely to dispense frank observations and highlight the folly of his monarch. This presents a clashing irony as a greater man could dispense the same advice and find himself being detained in the dungeons or even executed. Only as the lowliest member of the court can the jester be the monarch's most useful adviser.

In Shakespeare

The Shakespearean fool is a recurring character type in the works of William Shakespeare. Shakespearean fools are usually clever peasants or commoners that use their wits to outdo people of higher social standing. In this sense, they are very similar to the real fools, and jesters of the time, but their characteristics are greatly heightened for theatrical effect. The "groundlings" (theatre-goers who were too poor to pay for seats and thus stood on the 'ground' in the front by the stage) that frequented the Globe Theatre were more likely to be drawn to these Shakespearean fools. However they were also favoured by the nobility. Most notably, Queen Elizabeth I was a great admirer of the popular actor who portrayed fools, Richard Tarlton. For Shakespeare himself, however, actor Robert Armin may have proved vital to the cultivation of the fool character in his many plays.

Modern usage

Buffoon

In a similar vein, a buffoon is someone who provides amusement through inappropriate appearance or behavior. Originally the term was used to describe a ridiculous but amusing person. The term is now frequently used in a derogatory sense to describe someone considered foolish, or someone displaying inappropriately vulgar, bumbling or ridiculous behavior which is a source of general amusement. The term originates from the old Italian "buffare", meaning to puff out one's cheeks that also applies to bouffon. Having swelled their cheeks they would slap them to expel the air and produce a noise which amused the spectators.

Carnival and medieval reenactment
Today, the jester is portrayed in different formats of medieval reenactment, Renaissance fairs, and entertainment, including film, stage performance, and carnivals. During the Burgundian and the Rhenish carnival, cabaret performances in local dialect are held. In Brabant this person is called a "tonpraoter" or "sauwelaar", and is actually in or on a barrel. In Limburg they are named "buuttereedner" or "buutteredner" and in Zeeland they are called an "ouwoer". They all perform a cabaret speech in dialect, during which many current issues are reviewed. Often there are local situations and celebrities from local and regional politics who are mocked, ridiculed and insulted. The "Tonpraoter" or "Buuttereedner" may be considered successors of the jesters.

Notable jesters

Historical
 Tom le Fol (c. 13th century), the 1st resident jester of Conwy, North Wales, and personal jester to Edward I
 Triboulet (1479–1536), court jester of Kings Louis XII and Francis I of France
 Stańczyk (c. 1480–1560), Polish jester
 João de Sá Panasco (fl. 1524–1567), African court jester of King John III of Portugal, eventually elevated to gentleman courtier of the Royal Household and Knight of St. James
 Jane Foole (c. 1543 - 1558), natural fool of Catherine Parr and Mary I of England
 Will Sommers (died 1560), court jester of King Henry VIII of England
 Chicot (c. 1540–1591), court jester of King Henry III of France
 Mathurine de Vallois (fl. 1589 - fl. 1627), court jester of Henry III of France and Henry IV of France
 Archibald Armstrong (died 1672), jester of King James I of England
 Jeffrey Hudson (1619–c. 1682), "court dwarf" of Henrietta Maria of France
 Jamie Fleeman (1713–1778), the Laird of Udny's Fool
 Perkeo of Heidelberg, 18th century, jester of Prince Charles III Philip, Elector Palatine
 Sebastian de Morra, (died 1649) court dwarf and jester to King Philip IV of Spain
 Don Diego de Acedo, court dwarf and jester to Philip IV of Spain
 Roulandus le Fartere, a medieval flatulist who lived in twelfth-century England

Modern-day jesters
 Jesse Bogdonoff (b. 1955), court jester and financial advisor to King Taufa'ahau Tupou IV of Tonga
 Russel Erwood (b. 1981), known as Erwyd le Fol, is the 2nd official resident jester of Conwy in North Wales replacing the jester of 1295

Fictional jesters
Rigoletto - eponymous jester to the Duke of Mantua in Giuseppe Verdi's 1851 opera Rigoletto.
Yorick - dead court jester in William Shakespeare's play Hamlet.
Puck - court jester to the king of the fairies, Oberon in Shakespeare's A Midsummer Night's Dream.
Jack Point - a 'strolling jester' in Gilbert and Sullivan's 1888 Savoy Opera, The Yeomen of the Guard.

Gallery

See also

 Basil Fool for Christ
 Cap ‘n’ Bells
 Clowns
 Clown society
 Drollery
 Fool (stock character)
 Fool's literature
 Foolishness for Christ
 Fools Guild, California “Jester” themed entertainment troupe
 Harlequin
 Itinerant poet
 Jester of Genocide
 King Momo
 Madame d'Or
 Marotte – the staff often carried by jesters
 Master of the Revels
 Punakawan, comedic sidekick in Javanese tales
 Skomorokh
 Trickster

Footnotes

References
 Billington, Sandra A Social History of the Fool, The Harvester Press, 1984. 
 Doran, John A History of Court Fools, 1858
 Hyers, M. Conrad, The Spirituality of Comedy: comic heroism in a tragic world 1996 Transaction Publishers 
 Otto, Beatrice K., "Fools Are Everywhere: The Court Jester Around the World," Chicago University Press, 2001
 Southworth, John, Fools and Jesters at the English Court, Sutton Publishing, 1998. 
 Swain, Barbara. “Fools and Folly During the Middle Ages and the Renaissance” Columbia University Press, 1932.
 Welsford, Enid: The Fool : His Social and Literary History (out of print) (1935 + subsequent reprints): 
 Janik, Vicki K. (ed.) (1998). Fools and Jesters in Literature, Art, and History: A Bio-bibliographical Sourcebook. Greenwood Publishing Group, USA. .

External links

 Fooling Around the World (A history of the court jester)
 Foolish Clothing: Depictions of Jesters and Fools in the Middle Ages and Renaissance What 14th-16th century jesters wore and carried, as seen in illustrations and museum collections.
 Costume (Jester Hat), ca. 1890-1920, in the Staten Island Historical Society Online Collection Database

Entertainment occupations
 
Medieval performers
Jungian archetypes